Surname:
Kourosh Zolani (born 1970), Iranian-American composer and musician

Given name:
Zolani Mahola (born 1981), South African singer
Zolani Marali (born 1977), South African boxer
Zolani Petelo (born 1975), South African boxer
Zolani Tete (born 1988), South African boxer